Following is a list of Dutch architects in alphabetical order by birth century.

Born in the 15th century
 Jan Heyns (14??–1516)

Born in the 16th century

 Bartholomeus van Bassen (c.1590–1652)
 Salomon de Bray (1597–1664)
 Jacob van Campen (1596–1657) 
 Lieven de Key (c.1560–1627)
 Hendrick de Keyser (1565–1621)
 Pieter de Keyser (c.1595–1676)
 Thomas de Keyser (c.1596–1667)
 Hans Vredeman de Vries (1527–c.1607)

Born in the 17th century

 Harmen van Bol'es (1689–1764)
 Simon Bosboom (1614–1662)
 Adriaan Dortsman (1635–1682) 
 Tielman van Gameren (1632–1706)
 Daniël Marot (1661–1752) 
 Maurits Post (1645–1677)
 Pieter Post (1608–1669)
 Steven Vennecool (1657–1719) 
 Justus Vingboons (c.1620–c.1698)
 Philips Vingboons (c.1607–1678)

Born in the 18th century

 Jan Bouman (1706–1776)
 Abraham van der Hart (1747–1820) 
 Jacob Otten Husly (1738–1796)
 Leendert Viervant (1752–1801)

Born in the 19th century

 Albert Aalbers (1897–1961)
 Gerrit van Arkel (1858–1918) 
 Herman Ambrosius Jan Baanders (1876–1953)
 Herman Hendrik Baanders (1849–1905)
 Karel de Bazel (1869–1923)
 Hendrik Petrus Berlage (1856–1934)
 Adrianus Bleijs (1842–1912)
 Berend Tobia Boeyinga (1886–1969)
 Alphons Boosten (1893–1951)
 Jo van den Broek (1898–1978)
 Jan Buijs (1889–1961)
 Eduard Cuypers (1859–1927)
 Pierre Cuypers (1827–1921)
 Theo van Doesburg (1883–1931) 
 Jan Drummen (1891–1966) 
 Willem Marinus Dudok (1884–1974)
 Jan Duiker (1890–1935)
 Cornelis van Eesteren (1897–1988) 
 Harry Elte (1880–1944) 
 Marinus Jan Granpré Molière (1883–1972)
 Jan Gratama (1877–1947)
 Quirinus Harder (1801–1880)
 Robert van 't Hoff (1887–1979) 
 Thomas Karsten (1884–1945)
 Michel de Klerk (1884–1923)
 Piet Kramer (1881–1961)
 Johannes Bernardus van Loghem (1881–1940) 
 Henri Maclaine Pont (1885–1971) 
 Johan van der Mey (1878–1949) 
 J.J.P. Oud (1890–1963) 
 Frits Peutz (1896–1974) 
 Henri Pieck (1895–1972)
 Sybold van Ravesteyn (1889–1983)
 Gerrit Rietveld (1888–1964) 
 Abraham Salm (1857–1915)
 C.P. Wolff Schoemaker (1882–1949) 
 Margaret Staal-Kropholler (1891–1966)
 Mart Stam (1899–1986) 
 Ad van der Steur (1893–1953) 
 Jan Stuyt (1868–1934) 
 Alfred Tepe (1840–1920)
 Jan Verheul (1860–1948)
 Leendert van der Vlugt (1894–1936)
 Hendrik Wijdeveld (1885–1987)
 Jan Wils (1891–1972)

Born in the 20th century

 Hugh Maaskant (1907–1977)
 Wiel Arets (born 1955)
 Jaap Bakema (1914–1981)
 Ben van Berkel (born 1957)
 Piet Blom (1934–1999)
 Abe Bonnema (1926-2001)
 Caroline Bos (born 1959)
 Johannes Brinkman (1902–1949)
 Pi de Bruijn (born 1942)
 Kees Christiaanse (born 1953)
 Jo Coenen (born 1949)
 Frits van Dongen (born 1946) 
 Erick van Egeraat (born 1956)
 Aldo van Eyck (1918–1999)
 N. John Habraken (born 1928)
 Hubert-Jan Henket (born 1940) 
 Herman Hertzberger (born 1932)
 Jan Hoogstad (born 1930)
 Francine Houben (born 1955)
 Jan van der Jagt (1924–2001)
 Rem Koolhaas (born 1944)
 Jón Kristinsson (born 1936)
 Winy Maas (born 1958)
 Jakoba Mulder (1900 – 1988)
 Siegfried Nassuth (1922-2005)
 Jacob van Rijs (born 1965)
 Susan Hendrik van Sitteren (1904-1968)
 Sjoerd Soeters (born 1947)
 Machiel Spaan (born 1966)
 Lars Spuybroek (born 1959)
 Nathalie de Vries (born 1965)
 Wilfried van Winden (born 1955)
 René van Zuuk (born 1962)
 Misak Terzibasiyan (born 1964)

See also

 List of architects
 List of Dutch people
 List of Dutch urban designers and planners
 :Category:Architecture firms of the Netherlands

Dutch
Architects